is a railway station located in the city of Tōkamachi, Niigata, Japan, operated by the third sector Hokuetsu Express. The station name is written in hiragana because when it was opened, there was already a Matsushiro Station (same as the kanji form of Matsudai), which has since closed. Also, it is to appear friendlier to the local community.

Lines

Station layout

The station has two ground-level opposed side platforms serving two tracks, connected to the station building by an underground passage. The station is staffed.

Platforms

Adjacent stations

History
The station opened on March 22, 1997.

Surrounding area
former Matsudai town hall
Matsudai Post Office

See also
 List of railway stations in Japan

References

External links

  Hokuetsu Express website 

Railway stations in Niigata Prefecture
Railway stations in Japan opened in 1997
Stations of Hokuetsu Express
Tōkamachi, Niigata